The Philadelphia Dumpster Divers are a group of about 40 Philadelphia-area based artists, collectors and friends who work largely with found objects and recycled materials.  They are notable for their extensive works and group efforts throughout a 30+ year history.

Members
Betsy Alexander
Kim Alsbrooks
Gretchen Altabef
Harry Anderson 
Sara Benowitz
Ellen Benson
Neil Benson
I. George Bilyk
Valerie Black
Robert Bullock 
Charmaine Caire
Randall Cleaver
Alden Cole
Carol Cole
cdavid Cottrill
Randy Dalton
Len Davidson
Donn 'Mondo' DesChaine
Charna Eisner
Dan Enright
George Felice
Gwendolyn Fryer
Bruce Gast
David Gerbstadt
Joanne Hoffman
Linda Lou Horn
Hugo Hsu
John Jonik
Ann Keech
Diane Keller
Smokie Kittner
Vance Lehmkuhl
John Lindsay
Leslie Matthews
Kate Mellina
Susan Moloney
Bob Murphy
Taji Nahl
Toni Nash
Kathryn Pannepacker
Dr. Photon
Eva Preston
Joe Revlock
Susan Richards
Ellen Sall
Leo Sewell
Michael Simons
Joel Spivak
Jim Ulrich
Sally Willowbee
Burnell Yow!
Isaiah Zagar

References
Arts Project to Revive South Street
Article on GoggleWorks show in Reading, PA
Article on 14th Annual Awards Banquet
The Please Touch Museum twitters about the dumpster divers
Newspaper reference to Please Touch show
2004 City Paper article
South Street Show a Philadelphia Weekly Pick
Sedgwick Cultural Center show an A-List choice
1999 InBusiness Magazine article (text version) on the Dumpster Divers
American Style Magazine feature article 'Down in the Dumps in Philly'
Found Object Art Book II with significant coverage of and an essay all about the PDDs and member artists
PDD in the 2006 Baltimore Kinetic Sculpture Race
Dumpster Divers Retake South Street

Philadelphia Dumpster Divers at Twenty

External links
Philadelphia Dumpster Divers Official Site
Philly Dumpster Divers semi-official flickr feed
Philadelphia Dumpster Divers Official Facebook Page

Arts organizations based in Pennsylvania
Found object
Organizations based in Philadelphia
Culture of Philadelphia